Just Me and You is a Canadian short drama film, directed by Sandrine Brodeur-Desrosiers and released in 2019. The film centres on eight-year-old Eva and her father going on a Montreal to Mexico road trip aboard an 18-wheeler.

Awards 
The film premiered at the 69th Berlin International Film Festival, where it won the Crystal Bear for Best Short Film (Kplus). It won several awards at other film festivals, including the Best Narrative Short award at the Hamptons International Film Festival, the Grand National Prize at the Saguenay International Short Film Festival in Saguenay, and the award for Best Editing at the Sapporo International Short Film Festival.

The film received a Canadian Screen Award nomination for Best Live Action Short Drama at the 8th Canadian Screen Awards, and won the Prix Iris for Best Live Action Short Film at the 22nd Quebec Cinema Awards.

References

External links
 

Canadian drama short films
Quebec films
2010s Canadian films